The 2005–06 season was the 91st season in the existence of A.S. Livorno Calcio and the club's second consecutive season in the second division of Italian football. In addition to the domestic league, Livorno participated in this season's edition of the Coppa Italia.

Pre-season and friendlies

Competitions

Overall record

Serie A

League table

Results summary

Results by round

Matches

Source:

Coppa Italia

References

U.S. Livorno 1915 seasons
Livorno